The 2009 TOYO Tires Dubai 24 Hour was the 4th running of the Dubai 24 Hour endurance event. The race was held at the Dubai Autodrome and was organized by the promoter Creventic. The official event commenced on 8 January and finished on 10 January 2009.

Overview
Practice days for the event began on 5 January 2009, followed by qualifying on 8 January which decided the grid positions for the race. The 24-hour event began on January 9 and finished on January 10.  A total 78 entrants from all over the world participated in the event.

Qualifying
Qualifying began on January 8 on a sunny afternoon. The cars from the A6 class dominated the top of the time table, and it was no surprise when one of the Porsche 997 GT3 cars occupied Pole Position. Apart from this, a notable curb in the domination of the Porsches was in the shape of a 3-Year Old Mégane driven by the Equipe Vershuur Team which took 3rd place on the grid with a stunning lap of 2:04.168, beating some of the more agile vehicles on the grid.

Pole position winners in each class are marked in bold.

Race
After 24 hours of racing at the Dubai Autodrome, only 49.676 seconds separated the 1st and second 2nd cars in the fourth running of the TOYO Tires Dubai 24 Hour. The final hour of the race that saw no less than three changes of the lead, the Porsche 997 GT3 Cup, entered by German team Land Motorsport and driven by Carsten Tilke, Gabriël Abergel, Andrzej Dzikevic and Niclas Kentenich, came out on top, only just defending its lead from the charging Al Faisal Racing Team’s BMW Z4 Coupé M that was shared by Abdualziz Al Faisal, Paul Spooner, Claudia Hürtgen and Stian Sorlie. 3rd was taken by another Porsche, the Besaplast Racing Team entry of Martin Tschornia, Franjo Kovac, former DTM-champion Kurt Thiim and the father-and-son pairing of Roland Asch and Sebastian Asch.

The Autorlando Porsche, which started from pole-position with Richard Lietz behind the wheel, and the identical Land Motorsport entry, driven by Marc Basseng, were able to pull a gap over Claudia Hürtgen with the Al Faisal Racing BMW Z4 Coupé M on the first few laps. On lap seven, there was the first lead change as Basseng managed to overtake Lietz.

Later on, the Autorlando Porsche lost about 45 minutes in the pits when the rear section of the car needed repair after another driver had run into it. There was a close battle between the Al Faisal Racing BMW and the ARC Bratislava Porsche (Miroslav Konopka, Jiri Janak, Mauro Casadei, Rudiger Klos) for many hours during the night. Around 05.00 h, the BMW took the lead, partly as a result of its slightly better fuel-efficiency, and stayed there for the next couple of hours, with the ARC Bratislava-Porsche and the Porsches of the Besaplast Racing Team and Land Motorsport following closely.

Later in the morning, the battle between the Al Faisal Racing BMW and the ARC Bratislava Porsche heated up again. With 1 hours and 10 minutes remaining the BMW came into the pits with a puncture and resulting damage to the right rear bodywork of the car, which handed the lead to the ARC Bratislava Porsche. That team stayed in front for a while and looked on its way to victory, especially as the BMW team were given a one lap penalty because of taking a shortcut. However, with 42 minutes remaining, the Porsche came in for another fuel stop and soon after that came in with apparent suspension problems, losing more valuable time and dropping back to fourth.

At that time, the Land Motorsport Porsche found itself in the lead with Niclas Kentenich behind the wheel, but the young German was put under massive pressure by Claudia Hürtgen in the Al Faisal Racing BMW Z4 Coupe M, who was lapping up to twelve seconds per lap faster than the Porsche. Eventually, Kentenich drove the victory home for the Land Motorsport Porsche team, finishing just 49.676 seconds ahead of the BMW. The Besaplast Racing Porsche finished third, although finishing driver Sebastian Asch had to overcome massive brake problems in his final stint.

Results
Class winners in bold.

Source:

References

 

Dubai
Dubai 24 Hour
Dubai 24 Hour